Omar Antonio Campos Chagoya (born 20 July 2002) is a Mexican professional footballer who plays as a left-back for Liga MX club Santos Laguna.

Club career
Born in Cuauhtémoc district of Mexico City, Campos grew up in the Tepito neighborhood before joining the youth setup at Santos Laguna in 2016. On 17 January 2021, he made his professional debut for Santos Laguna under manager Guillermo Almada in a Liga MX game against Tigres UANL. He came on as an 85th-minute substitute for Juan Ferney Otero as Santos won 2–0.

Campos scored his first professional goal on 6 February 2021 against Atlas, scoring the opening goal for Santos Laguna in their 1–1 draw.

International career
On 6 December 2021, Campos was included in the senior national team call-up by Gerardo Martino for a friendly match against Chile set to take place on 8 December.

Career statistics

Club

References

External links
 Profile at Santos Laguna

2002 births
Living people
Footballers from Mexico City
Association football midfielders
Santos Laguna footballers
Liga MX players
Mexican footballers